78th Regiment of Foot may refer to:

 78th Fraser Highlanders - properly the 78th (Highland) Regiment of Foot, also "Fraser's Highlanders" 1758 - 1763
 78th (Highland) Regiment of Foot, or Seaforth (Highland) Regiment - 1778 - 1786 thereafter renumbered as the 72nd Regiment of Foot
 78th (Highlanders) Regiment of Foot or "The Ross-shire Buffs" 1793 - 1881

See also
 78th Regiment (disambiguation)